Gibson County Courthouse may refer to:

Gibson County Courthouse (Indiana), Princeton, Indiana
Gibson County Courthouse (Tennessee), Trenton, Tennessee